This is a list of maria (large, dark, basaltic plains) on the Moon. It includes other basaltic plains, including the one oceanus as well as features known by the names lacus, palus and sinus. The modern system of lunar nomenclature was introduced in 1651 by Giovanni Battista Riccioli. Riccioli's map of the Moon was drawn by Francesco Maria Grimaldi, who has a crater named after him.

Maria and Oceanus

There was also a region on the Lunar farside that was briefly misidentified as a mare and named Mare Desiderii (Sea of Desire). It is no longer recognized. Other former maria include:

Mare Parvum ("Small Sea"), immediately to the east of Inghirami
Mare Incognitum ("Unknown Sea")
Mare Novum ("New Sea"), northeast of Plutarch
Mare Struve ("Struve's Sea"), near Messala

Lacus

A related set of features are the Lunar lacus  (singular also lacus, Latin for "lake"), which are smaller basaltic plains of similar origin:

Sinus and Paludes

A related set of features are the sinus  (singular sinus, Latin for "bay") and paludes  (singular palus , Latin palūs, palūdēs "marsh"):

Some sources also list a Palus Nebularum (Latin palūs nebulārum  "Marsh of Mists") at 38.0° N, 1.0° E. However the designation for this feature has not been officially recognized by the IAU.

See also

 List of craters on the Moon
 List of features on the Moon
 List of mountains on the Moon
 List of valleys on the Moon
 Selenography

References

 L. E. Andersson and Ewen A. Whitaker, NASA Catalogue of Lunar Nomenclature, NASA RP-1097, 1982, no ISBN.
 Ben Bussey and Paul Spudis, The Clementine Atlas of the Moon, Cambridge University Press, 2004, .
 Antonín Rükl, Atlas of the Moon, Kalmbach Books, 1990, .
 Ewen A. Whitaker, Mapping and Naming the Moon, Cambridge University Press, 1999, .

External links
NASA lunar Atlas
 Digital Lunar Orbiter Photographic Atlas of the Moon
 USGS: Moon nomenclature
 USGS: Moon Nomenclature: Mare
 USGS: Moon Nomenclature: Oceanus
 USGS: Moon Nomenclature: Lacus
 USGS: Moon Nomenclature: Palus
 USGS: Moon Nomenclature: Sinus

 
Moon-related lists